Huang Chih-hsien, also known as Joyce Huang, is a Taiwanese TV commentator, author and host on CTV and CTi TV between 2014 and 2019.

Incidents 
With views supporting Chinese unification and "One country, two systems" on her work and her show, Late-Night Punch, she receives various complaints from pro-Taiwan independence groups. At a forum in Xiamen in June 2019, Joyce Huang said the separation between the mainland China and Taiwan without unification is the "greatest pain of the Chinese nation" and the tragedy "should not be allowed to continue", which drew criticism of her and her brother, Tainan mayor Huang Wei-cher back in Taiwan.

References

External links 

Political commentators
Taiwanese writers
Taiwanese women writers
People from Taipei
Alumni of the University of Leicester
1964 births
Living people